Gertrude M. "Trudy" Coxe (born 1948) is an American environmental activist and historic preservationist who is the current CEO of the Preservation Society of Newport County and the former Secretary of Environmental Affairs in the Commonwealth of Massachusetts.

Biography
Coxe was born in 1948. She graduated from the Wheeler School in 1967.

As an employee of Save the Bay, Coxe helped organize the first annual Save the Bay swim in 1977, later serving as executive director of Save the Bay from 1979 to 1990. She ran an unsuccessful campaign as a Republican for Congress against Jack Reed in 1990. From 1993 to 1998 she served as Massachusetts' Secretary of Environmental Affairs under Governor Weld and Governor Cellucci. After leaving this position, she became C.E.O. of the Preservation Society of Newport County.

Coxe currently serves on various non-profit boards, including: "National Recreation and Park Association, the Appalachian Mountain Club, Grow Smart Rhode Island, the Rhode Island Commodores, the Metcalf Institute for Marine & Environmental Reporting, the Wheeler School, the Newport County Chamber of Commerce, Child and Family Services and the Attractions Council of Newport County."

Coxe is the recipient of honorary doctorate degrees from the University of Rhode Island, the Massachusetts Maritime Academy, and Roger Williams University.

References

Massachusetts Secretaries of Environmental Affairs
American environmentalists
American women environmentalists
American women chief executives
Rhode Island Republicans
Living people
1949 births
American nonprofit chief executives
Massachusetts Republicans
20th-century American politicians
20th-century American women politicians
21st-century American women